Supreme Courtship is a 2008 novel by Christopher Buckley, which tells the story of a Judge Judy-style TV judge nominated to the Supreme Court of the United States.

Plot summary

After several failed attempts to seek Senate approval for his Supreme Court nominations, perpetually unpopular President Donald P. Vanderdamp (nicknamed "Don Veto" by Congress) decides to get even by nominating Judge Pepper Cartwright, star of Courtroom Six and America's most popular TV judge, to the Supreme Court. Soon, Cartwright finds herself in the middle of a constitutional crisis, a Presidential campaign, and entanglements both political and romantic in nature.

Analysis

As described by Buckley on The Daily Show on October 21, 2008, the judge character is an attractive, gun-toting, glasses-wearing spitfire who is inexperienced in politics, drawing the obvious comparison to 2008 Republican Vice President Nominee Sarah Palin. However, Buckley finished the novel in January, months before Senator John McCain announced his choice. He then jokingly announced his retirement from satire, to which host Jon Stewart replied "Once the satirical book comes true within six months, you're done."

The Senate Judiciary Committee Chairman Dexter Mitchell has characteristics similar to Joe Biden, who chaired U.S. Supreme court nominations in his tenure. Buckley describes the character as "the cosmetically enhanced chairman of the Senate Judiciary Committee who ran unsuccessfully for president and who never shuts up." He has admitted that the chairman in the book is based on Joe Biden.

Many media pundits recognized the book's main conflict between the Chairman and Judge Cartwright as directly paralleling the contest between Vice-Presidential Democratic nominee Joe Biden and Republican nominee Sarah Palin.

See also
Supreme Court of the United States in fiction

References

External links
 "Supreme Courtship" at Twelvebooks.com
 The New York Times Book Review
After Words interview with Buckley on Supreme Courtship, September 14, 2008

American satirical novels
Novels by Christopher Buckley
2008 American novels
Twelve (publisher) books